Janusz Sanocki (5 March 1954 – 7 December 2020) was a Polish politician.

Sanocki served as a member of the Sejm from 2015 to 2019 for Law and Justice. He died from COVID-19 during the COVID-19 pandemic in Poland.

References

1954 births
2020 deaths
Members of the Polish Sejm 2015–2019
Deaths from the COVID-19 pandemic in Poland
AGH University of Science and Technology alumni
People from Nysa, Poland
Mayors of places in Poland